The Chief of the Royal Danish Navy is the professional head of the Royal Danish Navy.

History
The Admiralty existed from 1660 until the end of absolute monarchy in 1848. In 1852, the position of Navy Inspector is established as the commander of the navy. Following the Naval Law of 1909, the position was renamed the General Inspector for the Navy. After the Naval Law of 1932, the vice admiral would become Chief of the Naval Command and director of the Ministry of the Navy. In 1960, the position was renamed to Chief of the Navy. Following major reductions in the 1980s, the name was again changed, this time to Inspector of the Navy. In 1990, the Marine staff and the position of Inspector of the Navy were abolished, resulting in all areas of responsibility being transferred to the Admiral Danish Fleet. Following the Danish Defence Agreement 2013–17, the Admiral Danish Fleet was disbanded and reorganised into the Naval Staff. On 1 January 2019, as part of the Danish Defence Agreement 2018–23, the name was changed to Chief of the Naval Command.

List of chiefs

Navy Inspector
{| class="wikitable" style="text-align:center"
! rowspan=2| 
! rowspan=2| Portrait
! rowspan=2| Name
! colspan=3| Term of office
! rowspan=2| 
|-
! Took office
! Left office
! Time in office
|-

General Inspector for the Navy
{| class="wikitable" style="text-align:center"
! rowspan=2| 
! rowspan=2| Portrait
! rowspan=2| Name
! colspan=3| Term of office
! rowspan=2| 
|-
! Took office
! Left office
! Time in office
|-

Chiefs of the Naval Command
{| class="wikitable" style="text-align:center"
! rowspan=2| 
! rowspan=2| Portrait
! rowspan=2| Name
! colspan=3| Term of office
! rowspan=2| 
|-
! Took office
! Left office
! Time in office
|-

|-style="text-align:center;"
| colspan=7| VacantNo chief following Operation Safari

Chiefs of the Navy
{| class="wikitable" style="text-align:center"
! rowspan=2| 
! rowspan=2| Portrait
! rowspan=2| Name
! colspan=3| Term of office
! rowspan=2| 
|-
! Took office
! Left office
! Time in office
|-

Inspector of the Navy
{| class="wikitable" style="text-align:center"
! rowspan=2| 
! rowspan=2| Portrait
! rowspan=2| Name
! colspan=3| Term of office
! rowspan=2| 
|-
! Took office
! Left office
! Time in office
|-

Chiefs of the Admiral Danish Fleet

{| class="wikitable" style="text-align:center"
! rowspan=2| 
! rowspan=2| Portrait
! rowspan=2| Name
! colspan=3| Term of office
! rowspan=2| 
|-
! Took office
! Left office
! Time in office
|-

Chiefs of the Naval Staff
{| class="wikitable" style="text-align:center"
! rowspan=2| 
! rowspan=2| Portrait
! rowspan=2| Name
! colspan=3| Term of office
! rowspan=2| 
|-
! Took office
! Left office
! Time in office
|-

Chiefs of the Naval Command
{| class="wikitable" style="text-align:center"
! rowspan=2| 
! rowspan=2| Portrait
! rowspan=2| Name
! colspan=3| Term of office
! rowspan=2| 
|-
! Took office
! Left office
! Time in office
|-

See also
 Chief of Defence (Denmark)
 Chief of the Royal Danish Army
 Chief of the Royal Danish Air Force

References
Citations

Bibliography

 
 
 
 
 
 
 
 
 
 
 
 
 
 
 
 
 

Royal Danish Navy
Military of Denmark
Denmark
Chiefs of Staff (Denmark)